Lucya is a monotypic genus of flowering plants belonging to the family Rubiaceae. It only contains one known species, 'Lucya tetrandra' (L.) K.Schum. 

It is native to the Caribbean region. It is found in Cuba, Dominican Republic, Haiti, Jamaica and Puerto Rico.

The genus name of Lucya is in honour of Rose Lucie (or Lucy) Dunal (1798–1827), the sister of Michel Félix Dunal (1789–1856) who investigated Rubiaceae in Montpellier. The genus has several known synonyms; such as Clavenna , Clavennaea   and
Dunalia 

The species Latin specific epithet of tetrandra refers to the Greek tetrandrus meaning four-anthered, the anther is the pollen-bearing part of a stamen.
The genus was first described and published  Prodr. Vol.4 on page 434 in 1830. and the species was first published in H.G.A.Engler & K.A.E.Prantl, Nat. Pflanzenfam. Vol.4 (Issue 4) on page 27 in 1891.

References

Rubiaceae
Rubiaceae genera
Plants described in 1830
Flora of the Caribbean